The 2014 UEFA European Under-17 Championship elite round was the second round of qualification for the final tournament of the 2014 UEFA European Under-17 Championship in Malta. The 27 teams advancing from the qualifying round plus Germany, who received a bye to the elite round, were drawn into seven groups of four teams, where they played each other in a single round-robin mini-tournament hosted by one of the group's teams. The seven group winners qualified for the final tournament.

As the team with the highest UEFA under-17 coefficient, Germany were given a bye to this round. The draw for the elite round was held on 28 November 2013 and matches took place between 20 and 31 March 2014.

Seeding
The draw for the elite round was held at the UEFA headquarters in Nyon, on 28 November 2013.  Each team was placed in one of four drawing pots, according to their qualifying round results. The seven sides with the best records were seeded in Pot A, and so forth until Pot D, which contained the seven teams with the weakest records. During the draw, each group was filled with one team from every pot, taking into account that teams that played each other in the first qualifying round could not be drawn into the same group again.

Tiebreakers
If two or more teams are equal on points on completion of the group matches, the following criteria are applied to determine the rankings.
 Higher number of points obtained in the group matches played among the teams in question
 Superior goal difference from the group matches played among the teams in question
 Higher number of goals scored in the group matches played among the teams in question
 If, after applying criteria 1) to 3) to several teams, two teams still have an equal ranking, the criteria 1) to 3) will be reapplied to determine the ranking of these teams. If this procedure does not lead to a decision, criteria 5) and 6) will apply
 Results of all group matches:
 Superior goal difference
 Higher number of goals scored
 Drawing of lots
Additionally, if two teams which have the same number of points and the same number of goals scored and conceded play their last group match against each other and are still equal at the end of that match, their final rankings are determined by the penalty shoot-out and not by the criteria listed above. This procedure is applicable only if a ranking of the teams is required to determine the group winner.

Groups
The hosts of the seven mini-tournament groups are indicated below.

All times are CET (UTC+01:00) until 29 March 2014 and CEST (UTC+02:00) starting from 30 March 2014.

Group 1

Group 2

Group 3

Group 4

Group 5

Group 6

Group 7

Qualified teams

1 Only counted appearances for under-17 era (bold indicates champion for that year, while italic indicates hosts)

References

External links
UEFA.com

Uefa European Under-17 Football Championship Elite Round, 2014
Elite round
UEFA European Under-17 Championship qualification